Thomas Eugene "Bubba" Wilson (born August 7, 1955) is an American former professional basketball player. He played for the Golden State Warriors in the National Basketball Association for 16 games during 1979–80 after a collegiate career at Western Carolina University.

References

1955 births
Living people
American expatriate basketball people in the Philippines
Basketball players from North Carolina
Golden State Warriors draft picks
Golden State Warriors players
People from Gastonia, North Carolina
Philippine Basketball Association imports
San Miguel Beermen players
Shooting guards
Western Carolina Catamounts men's basketball players
American men's basketball players